The 2012 UK Open Qualifier 6 was the sixth of eight 2012 UK Open Darts Qualifiers which was held at the Metrodome in Barnsley on Sunday 15 April.

Prize money

Draw

References

6